The Yunnan nuthatch (Sitta yunnanensis) is a bird species in the nuthatch family Sittidae. It was first described by William Robert Ogilvie-Grant in 1900 based on a male holotype. The grey-blue upperparts contrast with the light, smooth, buffy lowerparts. It has a fine white eyebrow above a black eyestripe, which is distinct when the plumage is fresh, and exhibits a small degree of sexual dimorphism. A noisy bird, it produces simple, nasal sounds, sometimes in repetitive series. 

Its ecology is not well-known, but it feeds on insects that it finds on pine branches. It can be found in the prefectures of Yunnan, Sichuan, and Guizhou in Southwest China, where it prefers sparsely forested pine forests and avoids dense spruce and fir forests. It is listed as a near-threatened species on the IUCN Red List and it is generally rare but can be locally common. A 2009 study predicted that its population could decrease by 43.6–47.7% between 2040 and 2069.

Taxonomy
The Yunnan nuthatch was first described as Sitta yunnanensis by Scottish ornithologist William Robert Ogilvie-Grant in 1900 based on a male holotype brought from southern Yunnan by Captain Alfred Wingate. It was placed in the subgenus Micrositta by Buturlin in 1916. There are no subspecies. 

The canadensis group, which is also sometimes called the subgenus Micrositta, contains six species – the Yunnan nuthatch, the red-breasted nuthatch (S. canadensis), the Chinese nuthatch (S. villosa), the Corsican nuthatch (S. whiteheadi), Krüper's nuthatch (S. krueperi) and the Algerian nuthatch (S. ledanti). In 1953, the Dutch ornithologists Karel Voous and John G. van Marle thought that the Yunnan nuthatch formed a link between the canadensis and europaea groups, and simultaneously that it was very closely related to the canadensis group, of which it was a basal representative in terms of distribution and plumage. In 1957, Charles Vaurie postulated that the white-tailed nuthatch was the Yunnan nuthatch's closest relative. In 1998, Eric Pasquet studied the mitochondrial DNA about ten species of nuthatch, including the different species in the canadensis group, but the Yunnan nuthatch was not included in the study. In 2014, Éric Pasquet and colleagues published a nuclear and mitochondrial DNA-based phylogeny of 21 species of nuthatch and confirmed the 1998 study relationships within the canadensis group, adding the Yunnan nuthatch, which is found to be the most basal species of the group.

Description

The  of the Yunnan nuthatch are blue-grey, including the calotte, despite being separated from the upper mantle by a paler area. It has a thin white eyebrow, which extends to the forehead and surmounts a black eyestripe, which widens noticeably on the back, on the sides of the mantle. The eye has a fine white circle around it, and it has a white cheek and throat. The  are plain and pale, pinkish buff. The beak is thin and pointed and the almost straight culmen can give the impression that the tip of the beak is coming up. Its irises are dark brown, the bill gray-black with the base of the lower mandible horny or yellowish, and the legs and feet are gray-brown.

The species exhibits little sexual dimorphism, but the black of the female's eyestripe is on average less intense and its underparts are duller and grayer. The plumage is fresh from August, and gradually wears down until the following spring. In worn plumage, the whitish tips of the eyebrow feathers are worn away, and the eyebrow line becomes discontinuous or inconspicuous. The upperparts are duller, less blue. The tail and wing feathers also wear out, but the blue-gray tips of the rectrices persist at least until May. The underparts become duller and dirtier, turning grayish-white. The young is duller than the adult, with the eyebrow less marked and not extending to the forehead, sometimes almost absent and consisting of a lighter cap margin. The eye line is also less wide, the cheek is dirty gray and not white. The throat is whiter, but the rest of the underparts are duller, grayish cinnamon, though not as pale as in a worn plumaged adult. The upperparts are duller and grayer. The bill of fledged young is shorter and has a pale base. Adults undergo a complete moult from July to September, and perhaps sometimes a partial moult before the breeding season in January and February, which includes the breast.

The giant nuthatch can occur in the same type of habitat as the Yunnan nuthatch, but is much larger in size and lacks a white eyebrow. The chestnut-vented nuthatch is closer in size to the Yunnan nuthatch, but has reddish flanks and no white eyebrows.

Ecology and behaviour

Vocalizations

The Yunnan nuthatch is a fairly noisy bird, and typically makes many individual sounds: nit, tit, pit, or a low and nasal . It also produces a harsh  or  call, a trait shared by other small nuthatches.

Food and breeding
The diet of the Yunnan nuthatch is not well-known, but it is known to consume insects it catches on pine branches. There is a lack of information about its reproduction, but a female was collected on 9 March that was close to laying, while recently born Yunnan nuthatches were collected on 21 May.

Distribution and habitat

The Yunnan nuthatch is endemic to Southwest China, and mainly occurs in the prefectures of Yunnan, Sichuan, and Guizhou. A study published in 2003 identified the species being endemic to China, and identified the Hengduan Mountains as the main area of endemism.

The Yunnan nuthatch is a sedentary species. It inhabits pine forests with sparse undergrowth, and avoids dense spruce and fir forests.

Threats and protection 
In 1987, Chinese ornithologist Zheng Zuoxin described the Yunnan nuthatch as rare, but it is locally common in areas such as Lijiang's pine forests. It is threatened by habitat destruction and is dependent on old pine forests, but also appears to live in degraded habitats. A 2009 study attempted to predict the impact of climate change on nuthatches in Asia, and shows the Yunnan nuthatch's distribution decreasing by between 43.6% and 47.7% by 2040–2069. The species has been listed as near-threatened species by the International Union for Conservation of Nature.

References

Yunnan nuthatch
Birds of Yunnan
Endemic birds of China
Taxa named by William Robert Ogilvie-Grant
Yunnan nuthatch
Taxonomy articles created by Polbot